The Heart of the Bear is a 2001 Estonian, Czech, German, Russian co-produced romantic drama film directed by Arvo Iho. It was Estonia's submission to the 74th Academy Awards for the Academy Award for Best Foreign Language Film, but was not accepted as a nominee. It was also entered into the 24th Moscow International Film Festival.

Cast
 Rain Simmul as Nika / Nganasan
 Dinara Drukarova as Gitya
 Ilyana Pavlova as Emily
 Külli Teetamm as Laima
 Lembit Ulfsak as Simon
 Nail Chaikhoutdinov as Tolkun
 Arvo Kukumägi as Venjamin
 Galina Bokashevskaya as Katherine
 Merle Palmiste as Grey-One

References

External links 
 

2001 films
Estonian drama films
Russian romantic drama films
Estonian-language films
2000s Russian-language films
2001 romantic drama films
Czech drama films
German drama films
Films directed by Arvo Iho
2000s German films